South Lake is a subtropical shallow freshwater lake located in Nanhu Subdistrict, in the southern suburbs of Wuchang, Wuhan, Hubei Province, China. It has an average depth of 1.6 metres, lake bottom elevation 18 m, the
width of the lake is about 15.4 km long, the length of the lake is about 5.4 km wide, area of 5km².

Water pollution
The area around the lake is densely populated. Since the 1980s, with the development of industry, and the dramatic increase in population, South Lake’s water quality has gradually deteriorated, and the eutrophication process has intensified.

References

Tourist attractions in Wuhan
Lakes of Wuhan